Mark Mauer (born c. 1960) is a former American football player and coach. He served as the head football coach at Concordia University in Saint Paul, Minnesota from 2004 to 2010, compiling a record of 40–39. As a college football player, Mauer was the starting quarterback at the University of Nebraska in 1981. Mauer is a cousin of professional baseball player Joe Mauer.

Mauer resigned from coaching high school football Hill-Murray School following being charged with prostitution; the charges were ultimately dropped and Mauer received one year of probation.

Head coaching record

College

References

Year of birth missing (living people)
Living people
American football quarterbacks
Ball State Cardinals football coaches
Concordia Golden Bears football coaches
Nebraska Cornhuskers baseball players
Nebraska Cornhuskers football coaches
Nebraska Cornhuskers football players
New Mexico State Aggies football coaches
North Dakota State Bison football coaches
Wisconsin Badgers football coaches
High school football coaches in Minnesota